Emil Sembach (April 2, 1891 – July 1, 1934) was an SS-Oberführer (Senior Colonel) attached to the SS headquarters of Silesia. He had joined the Nazi Party in 1925, and received a promotion the SS in 1931.

Biography 
Emil Sembach was born  on 2 April 1891, near Grein, Upper Austria.

Education 
After the studying school, he with the High School to a humanistic school in Coburg graduated, afterwards joined Emil Sembach as a cadet in a Magdeburg Artillery Regiment one.

Career 
At the First World War took it as a battery commander in part. From 1919 to 1921 was he a member of a volunteer corps to fight in the Baltic states involved. Then earned it until 1932 his livelihood in commercial professions, most recently as assistant manager in Berlin.  In 1934, after being caught by Reinhard Heydrich's Sicherheitsdienst (SD), for embezzlement and also for having a homosexual relationship with Curt Wittje, he was expelled from the party and the SS. Fearing for his life he asked Minister of the Interior Wilhelm Frick for protection, but his protection could not save him when on the Night of the Long Knives Sembach was arrested on the orders of his rival Udo von Woyrsch, and the next day under the command of SS-Obersturmführer (1st Lieutenant) Paul Exner, Sembach was taken to the Giant Mountains and executed on the orders of von Woyrsch.

References 

1891 births
1934 deaths
People from Lower Austria
20th-century Austrian people
SS-Oberführer
Victims of the Night of the Long Knives
German Lutherans
Austrian Lutherans
German people of Austrian descent
Members of the Reichstag of Nazi Germany
Austrian people executed by Nazi Germany
Executed Austrian Nazis
20th-century Freikorps personnel
20th-century Lutherans
German Army personnel of World War I

Nazis executed by Nazi Germany
Nazis executed by firearm
People executed by Nazi Germany by firearm